Thomas Lake (died 1606), of Fairlight and Hastings, Sussex, was an English politician.

Lake was a Member of Parliament for Hastings in 1572, 1584 and 1586.

References

16th-century births
1606 deaths
People from Hastings
English MPs 1572–1583
English MPs 1584–1585
English MPs 1586–1587